The Honeymooners is a classic American television sitcom created by and starring Jackie Gleason.

The Honeymooners may also refer to:

 The Honeymooners (2003 film), an Irish independent comedy film by Karl Golden
 The Honeymooners (2005 film), an American theatrical film by John Schultz
 "The Honeymooners" (King of the Hill), a season 13 episode
 The Honeymooner, a passenger train on the Pennsylvania-Reading Seashore Lines
 Brand New Life: The Honeymooners, 1989 pilot film of the American comedy-drama television series Brand New Life
 The Honeymooners, a 2017 musical based on the Jackie Gleason show directed by John Rando

See also
 Honeymooner, a 2010 British comedy-drama independent film